The first world record in the 400 m for women (athletics) was recognized by the International Amateur Athletics Federation, now known as the World Athletics, in 1957. 

To June 21, 2009, the IAAF has ratified 27 world records in the event. Their 2009 record progression list, however, lists 26 records.

Record progression 1957–1976

(y) indicates time for 440 yards (402.34 metres), ratified as a record for this event
(+) plus sign denotes en route time during longer race

The "Time" column indicates the ratified mark; the "Auto" column indicates a fully automatic time that was also recorded in the event when hand-timed marks were used for official records, or which was the basis for the official mark, rounded to the 10th of a second, depending on the rules then in place.

Record progression from 1975

From 1975, the IAAF accepted separate automatically electronically timed records for events up to 400 metres. Starting January 1, 1977, the IAAF required fully automatic timing to the hundredth of a second for these events. 

Riitta Salin's 50.14 from 1974 was the fastest recorded result to that time.

References

400, women
World record women